"Offshore" is the debut single by British electronic music artist Chicane, released on 9 December 1996 from his debut album, Far from the Maddening Crowds (1997). The song reached number five in the United States on Billboards Hot Dance Club Songs chart, number 12 in Ireland and number 14 in the United Kingdom. A bootleg by Australian DJ Anthony Pappa was given an official release in 1997 titled "Offshore '97". This version peaked at number 17 in the UK.

"Offshore" is a lush, multi-layered, early Trance track, the original of which features sweeping synth chords and a reflective balearic theme, elements of which are reminiscent of the Tangerine Dream track, "Love on a Real Train". The main synth-hook which gives  "Offshore" its uplifting breakdown however is based on Don Henley's 1985 hit, "The Boys of Summer".

Critical reception
A reviewer from Music Week described "Offshore" as "Dreamhouse with real excitement." Brad Beatnik from the RM Dance Update praised the track, rating it five out of five. He wrote, "A monstrously huge trancey house tune, this one goes on for ever, coasting on waves of lush sounds. [...] The original is the sort of dreamy track Jose Padilla would kill to include on his 'Cafe Del Mar' albums. An absolute stunner." David Sinclair from The Times said, "Eerie techno track you can dance and chill to simultaneously."

Music video
The accompanying music video for "Offshore" was directed by Julien Berton.

Track listing
 European CD single
 "Offshore" (Disco Citizens Edit) – 4:27
 "Offshore" (Original Version) – 6:58
 "Offshore" (Disco Citizens Remix) – 9:23

 German CD single
 "Offshore" (Radio Edit) – 3:07  	
 "Offshore" (Original Version) – 6:58 	
 "Offshore" (Disco Citizens Remix) – 9:23 	
 "Offshore" (Disco Citizens Edit) – 4:27

Charts

Weekly charts

Year-end charts

Certifications

"Offshore '97"

"Offshore" was re-released on 1 September 1997 as "Offshore '97". A bootleg was created by Australian DJ Anthony Pappa who made a mashup of "Offshore (Disco Citizens Mix)" with the vocals from the Power Circle song "A Little Love, a Little Life". Originally a bootleg (mixed by Dave Seaman on Renaissance: The Mix Collection Part 4) it was turned into an official release, credited to "Chicane with Power Circle". The song peaked at number 17 on the UK Singles Chart.

The vocalist was Louise Burton, wife of Daniel Mays. "Offshore '97 (Anthony Pappa Bootleg Mix)" also appeared on Far from the Maddening Crowds.

Track listings
 European CD single
 Chicane with Power Circle – "Offshore '97" (Anthony Pappa Bootleg Mix) (R&D Edit) – 3:52
 Chicane – "Red Skies" (Edit)  – 7:36
 Chicane – "Offshore" (Disco Citizens Edit)  – 4:27
 Chicane – "Offshore" (A Man Called Adam Remix)  – 9:04

 UK 12-inch vinyl
 Chicane – "Red Skies" (Original Mix)
 Chicane With Power Circle – "Offshore '97" (Salt Tank Pacific Storm Edit)
 Chicane With Power Circle – "Offshore '97" (Anthony Pappa Bootleg Mix)

Charts

Weekly charts

Year-end charts

"Armin van Buuren & AVIRA vs. Chicane"

In 2022, Armin van Buuren & AVIRA create the remake "Offshore" with Chicane in album compilation "A State Of Trance 2022".

References

1996 songs
1996 debut singles
1997 singles
Chicane (musician) songs
Songs written by Chicane (musician)
Trance songs